Kim Wan-su (born 10 May 1939) is the Vice Chairman of the Supreme People’s Assembly (SPA) of the Democratic People's Republic of Korea (DPRK, North Korea). He was demoted from his positions as President of the Central Bank of the Democratic People's Republic of Korea and as Minister of Finance by the SPA in September 2009, five months after his appointment. He was also the deputy finance minister and became the president of the Central Bank of the DPRK in October 2004 when former President Jong Song-thaek (정성택) was dismissed (according to Radio Pyongyang). 

He attended the annual central bank governors meeting of the Bank for International Settlements (BIS) in Basel, Switzerland, in June 2004 and June 2005. At the 2005 meeting, he met Bank of Japan Governor Toshihiko Fukui at the evening reception and exchanged brief words. Fukui told reporters: "I met him briefly at the reception. A substantial number of non-BIS members including North Korea are attending the meeting and it's a good thing."

References

Living people
Chairmen of the Presidium of the Supreme People's Assembly
Finance ministers of North Korea
Government ministers of North Korea
1939 births
North Korean bankers
President of the Central Bank of the Democratic People's Republic of Korea